This is the list of the number ones of the Official Subscription Plays Chart between 2009 and 2013. The chart was no longer compiled after November 2013.

Number-one songs

By artist
, seven artists have spent 10 or more weeks at the top of the Official Subscription Plays Chart so far during the 2010s. The totals below include only credited performances.

By record label
, nine record labels have spent 10 or more weeks at the top of the Official Subscription Plays Chart so far during the 2010s.

Notes

References

External links
Digital Plays Top 40 at the Official Charts Company

2010s in British music
Subscription Plays
Subscription Plays